The Australia Station was the British, and later Australian, naval command responsible for the waters around the Australian continent. Australia Station was under the command of the Commander-in-Chief, Australia Station, whose rank varied over time.

History

In the years following the establishment of the British colony of New South Wales in 1788, Royal Navy ships stationed in Australian waters formed part of the East Indies Squadron and came under the command of the East Indies Station. From the 1820s, a ship was sent annually to New South Wales, and occasionally to New Zealand.

In 1848, an Australian Division of the East Indies Station was established, and in 1859 the British Admiralty established an independent command, the Australia Station, under the command of a commodore who was assigned as Commander-in-Chief, Australia Station. The Australian Squadron was created to which British naval ships serving on the Australia Station were assigned. The changes were partially in recognition of the fact that a large part of the East Indies Station had been detached to Australian waters, and also reflecting growing concern for the strategic situation in the western Pacific in general, and in Tahiti and New Zealand in particular. In 1884, the commander of the Australia Station was upgraded to the rank of rear admiral.

At its establishment, the Australia Station encompassed Australia and New Zealand, with its eastern boundary including Samoa and Tonga, its western edge in the Indian Ocean, south of India and its southern edge defined by the Antarctic Circle. The boundaries were modified in 1864, 1872 and 1893. At its largest, the Australia Station reached from the Equator to the Antarctic in its greatest north–south axis, and covered a quarter of the Southern Hemisphere in its extreme east–west dimension, including Papua New Guinea, New Zealand, Melanesia and Polynesia.

On 1 January 1901, Australia became a federation of six States, as the Commonwealth of Australia, which took over the defence forces from all the States. In March 1901, the Commonwealth took over the colonial navies to form the Commonwealth Naval Forces. The Australian and New Zealand governments agreed with the Imperial government to help fund the Royal Navy's Australian Squadron, while the Admiralty committed itself to maintain the Squadron at a constant strength. In 1902, the commander of the Australia Station was upgraded to the rank of vice admiral. The boundaries were again modified in 1908. On 10 July 1911, King George V granted the title of "Royal Australian Navy" to the CNF.

The Australian Squadron was disbanded in 1911 and the Australia Station passed to the Commonwealth Naval Forces. The Station was reduced to cover Australia and its island dependencies to the north and east, excluding New Zealand and its surrounds, which became part of the China Station and called the New Zealand Naval Forces. In 1913, the Royal Australian Navy came under Australian command, and responsibility for the reduced Australia Station passed to the new RAN. The Royal Navy's Australia Station ceased in 1913 and responsibility handed over to the Royal Australian Navy and its Sydney based depots, dockyards and structures were gifted to the Commonwealth of Australia. The Royal Navy continued to support the RAN and provided additional blue-water defence capability in the Pacific up to the early years of World War II.

In 1921, a separate New Zealand Station was established, and the New Zealand Naval Forces renamed the New Zealand Division of the Royal Navy. In 1958, the Australia Station was redrawn again, now to include Papua New Guinea.

Commanders-in-Chief, Australia Station
The following is a list of the Royal Navy officers who occupied the post of Commander-in-Chief, Australia Station:

List of ships assigned to the Station
This is a list of ships that were assigned to the station between 1859 until 1913. The Australian Squadron was replaced by the Royal Australian Navy Fleet when it sailed into Sydney Harbour on 4 October 1913.

See also
Vice admiral (Australia)

References

Citations

Sources

Further reading

Commands of the Royal Navy
Royal Australian Navy
Military units and formations established in 1859
Military units and formations of the Royal Navy in World War I